Youssef Khater is a Danish fraudster who was convicted of attempted murder in Chile and fraud in Denmark. He previously served for 10 years in the Royal Danish Navy. Khater was dishonorably discharged at the age of 28 for fraud.

Criminal history 
Khater was arrested in 2009 for fraud, arson, embezzlement, and forgery but did not appear for his January 2011 trial. He was convicted of attempted murder of a Texas woman in Chile.

He ran a marathon in Costa Rica in 2015. In 2017, he was arrested and released in Puerto Viejo de Talamanca.

References 

Place of birth missing (living people)
Living people
Danish marathon runners
Danish male criminals
21st-century Danish criminals
Danish people of Lebanese descent
Royal Danish Navy personnel
People convicted of embezzlement
1978 births